Anthony Bryan Davis dela Cruz (born August 24, 1978) is a Filipino-American former professional basketball player and coach. He played majority of his career for the Alaska Aces of the Philippine Basketball Association (PBA), where he also served as an assistant coach after his playing career.

Born in West Covina, California, Dela Cruz is a Fil-American who had a stint in the US NCAA and was named as Shell's direct hire recruit in 1999. He became a legitimate PBA All-Star player with the Shell Turbo Chargers and was dealt to the Aces prior to Shell's exit from the PBA before the start of the 2005–2006 season. Following the retirement of former player and now assistant coach Jeffrey Cariaso, dela Cruz was named Alaska's team captain of this team since 2010.

He is also a former member of the RP National Basketball Team.

PBA career statistics

Season-by-season averages

|-
| align=left | 
| align=left | Shell
| 16 || 17.2 || .329 || .200 || .833 || 2.9 || .8 || .2 || .3 || 4.0
|-
| align=left | 
| align=left | Shell
| 37 || 14.5 || .374 || .250 || .611 || 2.5 || .6 || .4 || .1 || 3.4
|-
| align=left | 
| align=left | Shell
| 32 || 21.3 || .422 || .295 || .684 || 4.0 || 1.0 || .6 || .3 || 6.2
|-
| align=left | 
| align=left | Shell
| 35 || 34.3 || .443 || .417 || .716 || 6.7 || 2.1 || 1.3 || .3 || 14.5
|-
| align=left | 
| align=left | Shell
| 71 || 36.7 || .422 || .295 || .734 || 6.1 || 2.6 || .9 || .5 || 16.0
|-
| align=left | 
| align=left | Alaska
| 49 || 29.5 || .394 || .167 || .760 || 4.6 || 1.5 || .8 || .3 || 10.1
|-
| align=left | 
| align=left | Alaska
| 21 || 34.0 || .444 || .111  || .667 || 7.7 || 2.1 || .7 || .5 || 11.8
|-
| align=left | 
| align=left | Alaska
| 47 || 24.5 || .407 || .363 || .796 || 4.3 || .8 || .9 || .4 || 8.2
|-
| align=left | 
| align=left | Alaska
| 42 || 29.1 || .432 || .403 || .729 || 5.6 || 1.7 || .8 || .5 || 8.7
|-
| align=left | 
| align=left | Alaska
| 61 || 29.1 || .440 || .296 || .778 || 5.1 || 1.7 || .8 || .4 || 8.2
|-
| align=left | 
| align=left | Alaska
| 41 || 27.0 || .427 || .286 || .891 || 4.7 || 1.5 || 1.0 || .6 || 7.8
|-
| align=left | 
| align=left | Alaska
| 19 || 27.9 || .397 || .222 || .727 || 4.7 || 1.3 || .6 || .4 || 6.6
|-
| align=left | 
| align=left | Alaska
| 54 || 18.9 || .377 || .231 || .894 || 3.4 || 1.0 || .7 || .4 || 3.4
|-
| align=left | 
| align=left | Alaska
| 42 || 14.4 || .345 || .250 || .500 || 2.7 || .6 || .4 || .1 || 1.6
|-
| align=left | 
| align=left | Alaska
| 52 || 13.0 || .379 || .125 || .375 || 2.1 || .7 || .3 || .1 || 1.6
|-
| align=left | 
| align=left | Alaska
| 43 || 9.9 || .413 || .316 || .833 || 2.1 || .5 || .4 || .1 || 2.4
|-class=sortbottom
| align=center colspan=2 | Career
| 662 || 24.1 || .416 || .308 || .743 || 4.3|| 1.3 || .7 || .3 || 7.4

References

External links
 Player Profile at PBA-Online!

1978 births
Living people
Alaska Aces (PBA) players
Philippine Basketball Association All-Stars
Alaska Aces (PBA) coaches
Philippines men's national basketball team players
Filipino men's basketball players
Sportspeople from West Covina, California
Power forwards (basketball)
Shell Turbo Chargers players
Small forwards
UC Irvine Anteaters men's basketball players
American men's basketball players
American men's basketball coaches
Filipino men's basketball coaches
American sportspeople of Filipino descent
Citizens of the Philippines through descent